The Scottish Geographical Medal is the highest accolade of the Royal Scottish Geographical Society, awarded for conspicuous merit and a performance of world-wide repute. This was awarded first in 1890 as the Gold Medal, and from 1933 as the Scottish Geographical Medal.

Recipients of the Scottish Geographical Medal (1933 - )
Source:  RSGS

Recipients of the Gold Medal (1890 - 1927)
Source:  RSGS

See also

 List of geography awards

References

Awards of the Royal Scottish Geographical Society